The AAAA battery (usually read as quadruple-A) is 42.5 mm long and 8.3 mm in diameter. The alkaline cell weighs around 6.5 g and produces 1.5 V. This size battery is also classified as R8D425 (IEC) and 25 (ANSI/NEDA). The alkaline battery in this size is also known by Duracell type number MN2500 or MX2500 and Energizer type number E96.

History 
Energizer created the first AAAA battery in 1989, pressured by environmental initiatives to eliminate added mercury in batteries. Now most big battery manufactures (Energizer, Duracell), sell AAAA batteries.

Types

Uses

This battery size is most often used in small devices such as laser pointers, LED penlights, powered computer styluses, glucose meters, and small headphone amplifiers, with Microsoft's Surface Pen the most prominent product taking AAAA batteries. These batteries are not as popular as AAA or AA type batteries, and consequently are not as commonly available.

Some models of alkaline nine-volt battery contain six LR61 cells connected by welded tabs. These cells are similar to AAAA cells and can be used in their place in some devices, even though they are  shorter.

See also
 Battery (electricity)
 Battery nomenclature
 Battery recycling

References

External links
 Technical drawing of AAAA alkaline battery, based on ANSI specifications

Battery shapes